Hobnob, or similar terms may refer to:

 Hobnob biscuit, a brand of oat biscuit made by McVitie's
 Hobnob Theatre Company, a theater company in Butler, Pennsylvania

See also
 Hob Nob Anyone?, a website for fans of Reading Football Club
 Hob (disambiguation)